The submental artery is a branch of the facial artery that runs on the underside of the chin.

Course
The submental artery is the largest of the cervical branches of the facial artery, given off just as that vessel leaves the submandibular gland: it runs forward upon the mylohyoid, just below the body of the mandible, and beneath the digastric muscle.

It supplies the surrounding muscles, and anastomoses with the sublingual artery and with the mylohyoid branch of the inferior alveolar artery; at the symphysis menti it turns upward over the border of the mandible.

The submental vessels also supply a territory of skin in the submental area. Surgeons can use the skin and vessels in reconstruction of the face or the oral cavity.

Branching
When the submental artery turns upward over the border of the mandible it divides into a superficial and a deep branch.
 The superficial branch passes between the integument and depressor labii inferioris, and anastomoses with the inferior labial artery.
 The deep branch runs between the muscle and the bone, supplies the lip, and anastomoses with the inferior labial artery and the mental branch of the inferior alveolar artery.

Additional images

References 

Arteries of the head and neck